The Mysterious Bookshop is an independent bookstore and publisher specializing in mystery fiction, located in New York City. It is one of the oldest mystery bookstores in the U.S.

In addition to housing its own imprint, the shop contains the offices of both the Mysterious Press, distributed by Grove Atlantic, and MysteriousPress.com, an e-book imprint distributed by Open Road Media. The store and its various publishing enterprises are owned and operated by editor and publisher Otto Penzler; its inventory consists of new and rare titles in detective fiction, crime fiction, spy fiction, thrillers, and various other mystery fiction subgenres. The store also features the largest collection of Sherlock Holmes titles and Sherlockiana in the world, as well as a considerable Bibliomystery collection.

History
The Mysterious Bookshop opened on Friday 13 April 1979. In 2005, after 25 years at 129 West 56th Street, the building that housed the bookshop was sold, forcing the store to relocate to the Tribeca neighborhood. It is now located at 58 Warren Street.

Publishing
The Mysterious Bookshop publishes limited editions of important works in the mystery genre, and has published various series of original works in the field. The most current of these is the store’s Bibliomystery series, which features mystery novellas in which the plot involves a murder related to books or book collecting. Bestselling authors contributing to this series have included Ian Rankin, Joyce Carol Oates, and Nelson DeMille. John Connolly’s story, "The Caxton Lending Library and Book Depository," won the 2014 Edgar Award for best short story. These books are published in both a limited hardcover edition and in paperback.

The bookstore’s limited editions are bound in leather with marble boards, and have included titles by Michael Connelly and Lawrence Block, among others. They are currently in the process of printing a limited edition of the entirety of Lee Child’s Jack Reacher series.

References

External links
 The Mysterious Bookshop

Antiquarian booksellers
Book selling websites
Bookstores in Manhattan
Independent bookstores of the United States
Shops in New York City
Book publishing companies based in New York (state)
Retail companies established in 1979
American companies established in 1979
1979 establishments in New York City